Maidstone East railway station is one of three stations in the central area of Maidstone, Kent, England, but currently the only one with a regular direct service to London.

History
Maidstone East was opened as Maidstone by the London, Chatham and Dover Railway (LCDR) on 1 June 1874 as the terminus of the line from Otford. The location of the station was determined by local geography, as the ground from the River Medway west of the station rises sharply to the east.

In 1899, following the merger of the LCDR with the South Eastern Railway (SER) which operated the Medway Valley line, the station was given its current name to distinguish it from the SER's identically named station which was renamed Maidstone West. Following the grouping of mainline rail companies into regional railways in 1923, the Southern Railway undertook electrification as far as Maidstone East in 1939. Electrification to Ashford was carried out in 1961.

The high-level bridge over the Medway was rebuilt in 1927, as the original could not support the full weight of locomotive traffic. A footbridge was incorporated into the new bridge, allowing a shorter route to Maidstone Barracks station.

The goods yard comprised ten sidings on the down side and two on the up side. There was a goods shed and a 10-ton capacity crane. West of the high-level bridge, a siding on the down side served a corn mill. In 1939, this siding was electrified to provide berthing siding for electric multiple units. In 1882, the Midland Railway opened a coal depot at the station. Their successor, the London, Midland and Scottish Railway sold the depot in 1934, although it continued to be used for that purpose. Freight services at the station were withdrawn on 13 September 1965. A small locomotive depot was located on the up side. It closed in 1933. During the 1960s Tony Hocking was a booking clerk at the station, locally famous for invariably having a bottle of Vimto visible on the desk despite this being in contravention of the strict railway bylaws of the era.  On 2 August 2015, a fire damaged some of the station buildings. Part of the main goods yard was formerly a Royal Mail sorting office. The remainder is a car park for station users. A short siding from the down line to the west of platforms 2 and 3 is a remnant of tracks into the yard. The site of the up goods yard is now a car park.

Layout
The station is to the east of the River Medway but it is clear from a map of the town that it is actually located at the northern end of Maidstone. The approach from the west is via a high level truss bridge over the river, and a later girder bridge over the A229. Immediately east of the station is the portal to the  Week Street tunnel.

The booking office, open for most of the operational day, is located at street level on Station Road, above the tunnel portal, with other offices on up platform 1 as well as a coffee shop. There are also offices on Platform 2.

The station has three platforms: 1 and 2 are through platforms capable of handling trains of up to 8 cars. Platform three is a bay platform on the north (down line) side. Ramps lead down to the platforms on each side. A disused face to platform 1 shows the alignment of a former bay platform. A third track runs as a passing track through the station between the up and down lines.

A pedestrian walkway on the railway bridge provides a route to the Medway Valley Line's Maidstone Barracks station on the west of the river.

Development
There have been plans to redevelop the station for a number of years. In 2005 Network Rail announced that they were in talks with the John Lewis Partnership who intended to build a large Waitrose supermarket on the site. However, in November of that year, the developer that had been working on the deal pulled out taking John Lewis with them.
The following year a new redevelopment in conjunction with supermarket chain Asda was proposed. This development included a  store, hotel, 100 homes and parking for 515 cars. In 2007 it was reported that Asda were getting cold feet over the plans, although Asda stressed that talks were still ongoing, but in 2009 it was confirmed that Asda had withdrawn their interest due to their development of a site at the nearby St Peters' Street complex instead.

In November 2012, initial plans for the regeneration of Maidstone East Station were submitted to Maidstone Borough Council to determine whether an Environmental Impact Assessment was required. MBC concluded in December 2012 that due to the additional road traffic, an assessment would be appropriate. Plans include a new railway station, new large foodstore, other retail units, bar, cafe, commuter and retail parking (approx 1100 spaces) and associated landscaping. The proposed plan involves the demolition of the existing station ticket office, a disused hotel/bar, retail units opposite County Hall and the adjacent former Royal Mail sorting and enquiry office.

Accidents
The station has been the site of two accidents involving freight trains.

In the first, on 17 July 1967, a slow-moving westbound train passed a signal at danger and ran into the rear of a stationary passenger train at the up platform causing damage to both trains but only interrupting services for a few hours.

The second, on 6 September 1993, was more significant. At 02:02, a freight derailment occurred. A train, comprising 15 goods wagons was travelling from Dover to Willesden hauled by a Class 47 locomotive 47 288, when, due to excessive speed, the locomotive's rear bogie derailed in the tunnel approaching Maidstone East. The locomotive ended up on its side on the track. Several wagons left the track, running into signals, platforms and buildings, and spilling their load of 900 tons of steel cable. The driver subsequently failed a breathalyser test. The station remained closed for only a short period as a result of the accident.

Services
All services at Maidstone East are operated by Southeastern using  and  EMUs.

The typical off-peak service in trains per hour is:
 1 tph to London Charing Cross (semi-fast)
 1 tph to  

During the peak hours, the station is served by an additional hourly service between London Victoria and Ashford International.

On Sundays, the semi-fast services to London Charing Cross do not run.

See also
Maidstone Barracks railway station, on the Medway Valley Line
Maidstone West railway station, on the Medway Valley Line

References

Sources

External links

Kentrail.co.uk - Maidstone East

Railway stations in Kent
DfT Category C1 stations
Former London, Chatham and Dover Railway stations
Railway stations in Great Britain opened in 1874
Railway stations served by Southeastern
Railway accidents and incidents in Kent
1874 establishments in England
Buildings and structures in Maidstone